This is a list of members of the Victorian Legislative Assembly as elected at the 16 November 1911 election and subsequent by-elections up to the election of 15 November 1914:

Note the "Term in Office" refers to that members term(s) in the Assembly, not necessarily for that electorate.

 Beazley died 28 June 1912; replaced by Gordon Webber in July 1912.
 Craven died 28 November 1913; replaced by John Leckie
 Holden resigned in February 1913; replaced by Edmond Hogan the same month.
 McBride resigned in February 1913; replaced by John Pennington in March 1913.
 McGrath resigned in April 1913; replaced by John Chatham in May 1913.
 Swinburne resigned July 1913; replaced by William Murray McPherson in September 1913.

References
 Re-member (a database of all Victorian MPs since 1851). Parliament of Victoria.

Members of the Parliament of Victoria by term
20th-century Australian politicians